Desulfobacter  is a genus of bacteria from the family of Desulfobacteraceae.

References

Further reading 
 
 
 
 
 
 

Desulfobacterales
Bacteria genera